Nick Hornby (born 1980) is a British artist. He received his education at the Slade School of Art, University College London and Chelsea School of Art, a constituent college of the University of the Arts London. Hornby's work is known for his art-historical references and use of digital technology.

Career

He received his education at the Slade School of Art, University College London and Chelsea School of Art.  On graduating, he was awarded the "Clifford Chance/University of the Arts London Sculpture Award," described by ES Magazine as “The New Gormley”  and picked for the Evening Standard “Who to Watch in 2010”.  He is a Fellow of the Royal British Society of Sculptors.

Notable exhibitions and commissions

Nick Hornby's largest sculpture to date titled Twofold was commissioned by Harlow Art Trust. It is the 100th piece in Harlow's public sculpture collection which includes works by Auguste Rodin, Barbara Hepworth, Henry Moore, and Elizabeth Frink, among many others, so is a fitting environment for an artist whose subject is frequently the canon and its construction. For this commission, Hornby has crossed one of the most canonic of figurative sculptures, Michelangelo's David, with a curving line from a 1925 Kandinsky drawing. In one rotation, David is visible; in another, it is Kandinsky's abstract line.

Other notable commissions include a presentation of monumental sculpture at Glyndebourne Opera House in the UK, and 'Bird God Drone,' Commissioned by Two Trees Management Co, in partnership with NYC Parks’ Art in the Parks program for outdoor presentation in DUMBO, Brooklyn, NY,

He has exhibited his work in the UK, the US, Greece, and India, including Tate Britain (UK), Southbank Centre (UK),  Eyebeam (New York, USA), The Museum of Arts and Design (New York, USA), The Hub (Athens).

Critical responses

He has been reviewed in the New York Times, Frieze, Artforum, and featured in Dazed, Wired, and Time Out, among others.

References

External links
www.nickhornby.com

1980 births
Living people
British sculptors
British male sculptors
British contemporary artists
Alumni of University College London